Centar Zamet is a sports hall in Rijeka, with sporting, cultural, business and entertainment events.

The hall was built in Zamet in 2009 .The size of the hall is 16,830 m², and the surface of outer space is 88,075 m².

Awards
Vladimir Nazor Award yearly award for 2009 - Architecture and urbanism (2010)

ArchDaily -  "Building of the Year 2009" (2010)

Bernardo Bernardi Award (2010)

IOC / IAKS Award Silver medal (2011)

Events held

Sports events
European Individual Chess Championship - Men & Women (2010)
World Junior Championships - Men & Women (2010)
World Cadet Championships - Men & Women (2010)

Music events
Porin Award (2012)

Concerts
Klapa Intrade & Tomislav Bralić (2009)

Maksim Mrvica (2010)

Klape na Zametu (2010)

Massimo na Dan Žena (2011)

Parni Valjak „Unplugged“ (2013)

Lord of the Dance (2015)

Marko Tolja (2015)

Massimo Savić (2016)

Miroslav Škoro - „Mene zovu tambure“ (2016)

Damir Kedžo (2016)
Massimo - Valentine's Day (2020)

References

External links
Zamet Centre
Centar Zamet

Event venues established in 2009
Sports venues in Rijeka
Indoor arenas in Croatia
Basketball venues in Croatia
Handball venues in Croatia